Mikko Sipponen (2 July 1869, Valkjärvi – 17 May 1939) was a Finnish farmer, lay preacher and politician. He was a Member of the Parliament of Finland from 1907 to 1909, representing the Finnish Party.

References

1869 births
1939 deaths
People from Priozersky District
People from Viipuri Province (Grand Duchy of Finland)
Finnish Party politicians
Members of the Parliament of Finland (1907–08)
Members of the Parliament of Finland (1908–09)